The Longitude Prize is an inducement prize contest offered by Nesta, a British lottery funded charity, in the spirit of the 18th-century Longitude rewards. It runs a £10 million prize fund, offering an £8 million payout to the team of researchers that develops an affordable, accurate, and fast point of care test for bacterial infection that is easy to use anywhere in the world. Such a test will allow the conservation of antibiotics for future generations and help solve the global problem of antimicrobial resistance.

The prize was announced by the Prime Minister of the United Kingdom, David Cameron, in 2012, and a shortlist of six challenges to be put to a public vote was announced at the BBC's Broadcasting House in May 2014.

Longitude Committee
A committee chaired by Martin Rees, the Astronomer Royal, chose the six challenges that were to be put to a public vote, and subsequently decided the format of the prize and the specific challenges that must be met to win. The committee members are:

 Gisela Abbam, Chair, British Science Association
 Professor Rifat Atun, Professor of Global Health Systems, Harvard School of Public Health
 Andrew Cohen, Head of BBC Science Unit
 Professor Dame Sally Davies, Chief Medical Officer for England
 Professor David Delpy, Chair, Strategic Advisory Board, UK National Quantum Technologies Programme and Emeritus Professor of Biomedical Optics, UCL
 Andrew Dunnett, Director of the Vodafone Foundation

 Ravi Gurumurthy, Chief Executive Officer, Nesta
 Professor Dame Wendy Hall, Professor of Computer Science at the University of Southampton
 Roger Highfield, Director of External Affairs, Science Museum, London
 Dr Tim Jinks, Head of Drug-Resistant Infections Priority Programme, Wellcome Trust
 Dr Patrick Vallance, UK Government Chief Scientific Adviser
 Dr Penny Wilson, Innovation Platform Leader, Stratified Medicine, Innovate UK

Public vote 

The choice of challenges for the Prize was presented on an episode of the BBC science programme Horizon, with a poll opened to the public afterwards. The options were:
 Flight - How can we fly without damaging the environment? Design and build an aeroplane that is as close to zero carbon as possible and capable of flying from London to Edinburgh.
 Food - How can we ensure everyone has nutritious sustainable food? The next big food innovation.
 Antibiotics - How can we prevent the rise of resistance to antibiotics? Create a cost-effective, accurate, easy to use test for bacterial infections.
 Paralysis - How can we restore movement to those with paralysis? Give paralysed people the freedom of movement most of us enjoy.
 Water - How can we ensure everyone has access to safe and clean water? Create a cheap, environmentally sustainable desalination technology.
 Dementia - How can we help people with dementia live independently for longer? Develop intelligent, affordable technologies to help independence.

The winner, antibiotics, was announced on The One Show on BBC 1 on 25 June. The committee issued a draft of the criteria with a two-week opportunity for open review, which finished 10 August 2014.

The vote was urged and welcomed by the Biochemical Society and Jamie Reed, the Shadow Minister for Health at the time and chair of the All Party Parliamentary Group on Antibiotics (APPG-A), who said "The scale of the challenge that antimicrobial resistance presents is beyond any doubt and new innovative thinking is essential."

Seed funding

Since the announcement of the Longitude Prize, the foundation has selected thirteen organizations for seed funding between £10,000 and £25,000 to go toward their research. Called Discovery Awards, there have been three rounds of these grants.

References

External links
 
 Longitude Prize at Nesta 
 European Antibiotic Awareness Day

2014 establishments in the United Kingdom
Antimicrobial resistance organizations
Challenge awards
Crowdsourcing
Horizon (British TV series)
Innovation in the United Kingdom